NEOC may refer to:
 National Emergency Operations Centre, a government organisation of Switzerland
 New England Orienteering Club, an orienteering club in the United States
 2-deoxy-scyllo-inosose synthase, an enzyme